Elsa Obrajero Montes is a Mexican politician affiliated with the Party of the Democratic Revolution. As of 2014 she served as Deputy of the LIX Legislature of the Mexican Congress representing the Federal District as replacement of Diana Bernal.

References

Date of birth unknown
Living people
People from Mexico City
Women members of the Chamber of Deputies (Mexico)
Party of the Democratic Revolution politicians
Year of birth missing (living people)
Deputies of the LIX Legislature of Mexico
Members of the Chamber of Deputies (Mexico) for Mexico City